Alice Havergal Skillicorn CBE  (1894–1979) was a British academic. From 1935 to 1960, she was Principal of Homerton College, Cambridge.

Skillicorn was born in Ramsey, Isle of Man. She taught in London and Durham. She was an HMI from 1928 until her appointment at Homerton. She died on 3 February 1979.

References

1894 births
1979 deaths
20th-century Manx people
Commanders of the Order of the British Empire
Principals of Homerton College, Cambridge
Educational administrators